Limestone may refer to two different locations in the Canadian province of New Brunswick:

 Limestone, Carleton County, New Brunswick, a rural community
 Limestone, Victoria County, New Brunswick, a rural community